Søren Nils Eichberg (born 23 July 1973) is a German/Danish classical composer and conductor.

Biography 

Eichberg was born in Stuttgart, Germany. He studied piano, composition and orchestra conducting in Copenhagen, Cologne and Berlin. He had his first break-through in 2001 when winning the Queen Elisabeth Competition for Composers in Brussels in 2001. Other awards and honours include the Tanglewood fellowship, the German Konrad-Adenauer Composition Grant and the Composition Stipend of the Danish Arts Foundation.

In 2010 he was announced as the first composer-in-residence of the Danish National Symphony Orchestra in the orchestra's history, which led to a close collaboration with the orchestra over a period of five years and to premieres and recordings of several large-scale works. His symphonic work was in 2017 shortlisted for the German Music Authors' Prize. Hilary Hahn recorded his composition Levitation for her Deutsche Grammophon album In 27 Pieces: The Hilary Hahn Encores, which was awarded a Grammy Award in 2014.

His works include three symphonies, concertos, three operas and solo- and chamber music and are published by Universal Edition and Edition Wilhelm Hansen (MusicSales). He collaborates with Ensemble Modern, Mahler Chamber Orchestra and several radio orchestras across Europe.

As a conductor he has worked with Nordwestdeutsche Philharmonie, Hofer Symphoniker, Preussisches Kammerorchester, Berliner Symphoniker, Solistenensemble Kaleidoskop, Österreichisches Ensemble für Neue Musik and members of the Munich and Berlin Philharmonic Orchestras. As a guest lecturer he has been invited by Guildhall School of Music and Drama, Yaşar University and hdpk Berlin.

Glare 

Eichberg's chamber opera Glare, with libretto by Hannah Dübgen, was commissioned by Royal Opera House and opened in London in November 2014. Glare is a psycho-drama chamber-play with elements of science fiction, which focuses on the relationships between four protagonists one of who may or may not be an artificial human. It gained attention among bloggers, twitterers and the press with some calling it unnecessary violent or even misogynist, while others praised it as the perfect opera for the digital age. Richard Morrison in his review in The Times gave it 5 out of 5 stars saying that he couldn't remember a more gripping 75 minutes of avant-garde music-theatre than Glare. The opera has since been staged in Koblenz and Riksteatern. 

Eichberg's follow-up opera about the European refugee crisis premiered at Staatstheater Wiesbaden in September 2017.

References

External links
Eichberg's web-site
 Søren Nils Eichberg biography and works on the UE website (publisher)
 Søren Nils Eichberg biography and works on the Music Sales Classical website (publisher)

1973 births
Living people
21st-century classical composers
Danish classical composers
German male classical composers
German classical composers
Prize-winners of the Queen Elisabeth Competition
21st-century German composers
21st-century German male musicians